O Soundtrack My Heart is the second album by PVT (still under the band's original name, Pivot) – their first on Warp Records. It was released on 9 August 2008 in Australia, and 18 August in Europe.

The album was produced by Pivot in Sydney via London throughout 2006, tracked by Scott Horscroft, mixed by John McEntire (Tortoise, The Sea and Cake) in May 2007 and mastered by Noel Sommerville (Interpol, White Stripes).

The album's cover art contains images by French artist Michel Granger who was also responsible for the sleeve of Jean Michel Jarre's album Oxygène. Indeed, the sleeve of O Soundtrack My Heart bears a thematic similarity to the cover of Jarre's Oxygène 7–13 album.

In 2009 the song "Fool in Rain" was covered by Scott Herren's 'Diamond Watch Wrists' for the Warp20 (Recreated) compilation.

Reception

Track listing 

October – 1:52
In The Blood – 4:34
O Soundtrack My Heart – 5:40
Fool in Rain – 3:09
Sing, You Sinners – 3:38
Sweet Memory – 5:47
Love Like I – 4:54
Didn't I Furious – 3:30
Epsilon – 6:31
Nothing Hurts Machine – 4:58
My Heart Like Marching Band – 3:44

References 

PVT (band) albums
2008 albums